The Symphony in E-flat major, Op. 11, No. 3 is a late symphony by Johann Stamitz, likely written in Paris in 1754 or 1755. It was published as No. 6 in a 1769 publication of six symphonies by Stamitz. This is one of his last symphonies and is in the standard four-movement symphonic scheme of the time:
Allegro assai
Andantino
Menuetto – Trio
Prestissimo

It is approximately fifteen minutes in length, and demonstrates Stamitz's late symphonic style. It demonstrates the culmination of the Mannheim school of orchestral playing which emphasized extended techniques for the instruments (musicians at this time were mostly people with free time and simply played when asked), among them an attention to detail of dynamics. The concept of Sturm und Drang can be seen in this work with very sudden dynamic changes and a sharp texture change, presented when the oboes enter with the "B" theme.

Notes

External links

Symphony E-Flat
Stamitz
Compositions in E-flat major